Walker James Cress (March 6, 1917 – April 21, 1996) was an American professional baseball player and scout.

Cress' professional playing career began in 1939 in the Boston Red Sox' farm system. He missed the 1943–1945 seasons in World War II military service, but the website Baseball in Wartime lists no service branch under his name. In 1946, Cress returned to baseball and won 19 of 22 decisions for the Lynn Red Sox of the Class B New England League. The next year, 1947, he won 15 of 20 decisions for the New Orleans Pelicans of the Double-A Southern Association.

Cress then was acquired by Cincinnati, setting the stage for his major-league career. He worked in 30 games for the 1948 Reds, with two assignments as a starting pitcher. He posted his only MLB complete game on October 1, 1948, during the season's final weekend. Facing the Pittsburgh Pirates at Crosley Field, he had held the Bucs to two hits and no runs over eight innings, and was nursing a 1–0 lead going into the ninth. But in  the final frame, he surrendered four hits and two runs, and when the Reds could not respond in their half of the ninth, Cress was tagged with the loss, his only MLB decision.

Cress then worked in three early-season games in 1949 and pitched two scoreless innings coming of the Reds' bullpen before returning to the minors for the rest of his career. As a big leaguer, he allowed 62 hits and 45 bases on balls in 62 total innings pitched, with 33 strikeouts and no saves. He won a combined 33 games for the Tulsa Oilers of the Double-A Texas League in 1949–50, and ended his minor-league career with 99 victories.

After his pitching career, Cress became a scout for the St. Louis Cardinals and San Francisco Giants.

References

External links

1917 births
1996 deaths
Baseball players from Virginia
Canton Terriers players
Centreville Colts players
Cincinnati Reds players
Danville-Scholfield Leafs players
Greensboro Red Sox players
Louisville Colonels (minor league) players
Lynn Red Sox players
Major League Baseball pitchers
Memphis Chickasaws players
New Orleans Pelicans (baseball) players
People from Lee County, Virginia
Rocky Mount Red Sox players
Sacramento Solons players
St. Louis Cardinals scouts
San Francisco Giants scouts
Tulsa Oilers (baseball) players